Luther Harris Evans (13 October 1902 – 23 December 1981) was an American political scientist who served as the tenth Librarian of Congress and third Director-General of UNESCO.

Early life and career
Born in Bastrop County, Texas in 1902, Evans received his BA in 1923 and MA in 1924 from the University of Texas at Austin and his PhD from Stanford University in 1927, all in political science.

He taught political science at New York University, Dartmouth College and Princeton University from 1927 until 1935.  Evans left Princeton University abruptly after a faculty dispute.

Government service
Friends referred him for help to the powerful Lehman family of New York, who got him an appointment with Harry Hopkins, the advisor to Franklin Delano Roosevelt. At a meeting in the White House, Hopkins asked the young professor to propose a plan for a project Hopkins already wanted to do.  Evans went back the next day and told Hopkins that the project wasn't worth doing.  Instead, he pointed out that the States Archives of the United States were in a state of disarray with profound consequences to American history.  Hopkins said, "Dr. Evans, you have a lot of guts—I know you have no money and that your wife is nine months pregnant, and I have never thought about the state archives. But I hear that you have a good reputation." This is how Evans came to organize and direct the Historical Records Survey for the Works Project Administration from 1935 to 1939. Evans was later commended for successfully navigating the “frequently heated political environment of Harry Hopkins’ WPA” despite his relative youth and inexperience.

After this, he was appointed by Librarian of Congress Archibald MacLeish as head of the Legislative Reference Service and later Chief Assistant Librarian of Congress. After MacLeish resigned, president Harry S. Truman appointed Evans as his successor, a position he held from 1945 to 1953. During his tenure, Evans opposed censorship of the library's holdings, and greatly expanded the library's collection.  Well versed in international relations, he also returned a number of manuscripts to their countries of origin.  He helped draft the Universal Copyright Convention at Geneva in 1952.

During McCarthyism, Evans voluntarily instituted the Federal Loyalty Program at the Library of Congress, placing Verner Clapp in charge of a loyalty board to examine current and potential employees regarding communism and homosexuality.  This program resulted in numerous employees being fired or resigning for their political or sexual orientation, and William Carlos Williams was prevented from being appointed to the post of United States Poet Laureate.  Evans told Karl Shapiro "we don't want any Communists or cocksuckers in this library."

UNESCO
In 1953 he resigned from the Library to accept a position as UNESCO's third Director-General, the only American to hold this post.

Evans fired seven UNESCO employees who were US citizens because they refused to submit to a US government loyalty investigation.

He was active in international peace issues throughout his life, serving in many capacities with educational organizations and commissions.  He served as President of the United World Federalists in 1970-1976, and his thinking of this period is seen in his testimony before the Committee on Foreign Affairs in the U.S. House of Representatives on February 4, 1975 concerning "The United Nations in the 1970s:  Recommendations for U.S. Policy". Working with a range of other Americans prominent in foreign policy, including Father Theodore Hesburgh of Notre Dame, Norman Cousins of Saturday Review, James Grant of the Overseas Development Council, anthropologist Margaret Mead, World Federalist Chairman H. Donald Wilson, and World Bank president Robert McNamara, Evans organized an organization called New Directions.  New Directions was to be a U.S. citizen's lobby on international issues modeled on Common Cause.  It worked for a time, and helped pass the Panama Canal Treaty, but was ultimately unable to find enough funds to sustain it for the long term.

Later life
From 1962, he was director of international and legal collections at the Columbia University Libraries until his retirement in 1971.

He died in  1981 in San Antonio, Texas, aged 79.  He was unusual for his generation of Texans in speaking several languages fluently.  He was a renowned story teller who, like his contemporary Lyndon Baines Johnson, used humor to defuse tense political situations in long meetings and build consensus.

His nephew, Jim Evans, was an American League baseball umpire from 1972 through 1999.

References

 Biography of Luther Evans by Chloé Maurel in the Biographical Dictionary of SGs of IOs: 
 
www.hartford.edu - brief bios of the Librarians of Congress
www.unesco.org - UNESCO's brief bio on Evans
 Luther Evans Harris Papers, 1923-1989, Center for American History, The University of Texas at Austin 

1902 births
1981 deaths
People from Bastrop County, Texas
University of Texas at Austin alumni
Stanford University alumni
New York University faculty
Dartmouth College faculty
Princeton University faculty
Librarians of Congress
Columbia University librarians
UNESCO Directors-General
American political scientists
American officials of the United Nations
20th-century political scientists